Amethi railway station(station code: AME)  is one of the most important and busiest railway stations in Uttar Pradesh. Which serves the city of Amethi. This station has two platforms and a total of four tracks. This station is operated by the Northern Railway. The station is also proposed to become a junction in the near future. The following facilities have been provided to the passengers in the station. In which there is :-  Wi-Fi, clean drinking water, waiting rooms, chair sitting, Parking(outstation side) and toilet etc.

Major trains

Some of the important trains that runs from Amethi are :

 Varanasi–Anand Vihar Terminal Garib Rath Express
 Neelachal Express
 Bhopal–Pratapgarh Express (via Lucknow)
 Archana Express
 Yesvantpur–Lucknow Express (via Kacheguda)
 Lucknow–Yesvantpur Express
 Udyognagri Express
 Howrah–Jaisalmer Superfast Express
 Howrah–Lalkuan Express
 Varanasi–Lucknow Intercity Express (via Pratapgarh)
 Ekatmata Express
 Padmavat Express
 Malda Town–Anand Vihar Weekly Express
 Marudhar Express (via Pratapgarh)
 Malda Town–New Delhi Express
 Jaunpur–Rae Bareli Express

References

Railway stations in Amethi district
Lucknow NR railway division
Amethi